The National Museum of Ethnology is an ethnology museum in Lisbon, Portugal. The museum holds in its collections the most relevant ethnographic heritage in Portugal. It is responsible for the safeguarding and management of nearly half a million items.

The museum's ethnographic collections are divided into two separate groups. There is the collection assembled by the National Museum of Ethnology's staff dating from the museum's launch in 1962, created by the team who introduced the field of modern anthropology to Portugal. These collections, totaling 42,000 objects, are representative of 80 countries and 5 continents, with greater emphasis on cultures from Africa, Asia and South America, and traditional Portuguese culture.

Many of these collections were exhaustively documented through field research, and are inseparable from the important photographic, film, sound and drawing Archives that constituting a significant part of the nearly half a million items that make the Museum's movable heritage.

The second set of the museum's collection consists of 11,600 objects from the Popular Art Museum, largely assembled in the 1930s and early 1940s for the propaganda exhibitions promoted by the regime of Estado Novo. They differ significantly from their matching parts of the collections of the National Museum of Ethnology due to the lesser amount of information available, if any, about their origin.

Following the transfer of the collections of the Museum of Popular Art in 2007 to the building of the National Museum of Ethnology, both museums were merged in 2012 into a single museum – National Museum of Ethnology / Popular Art Museum.

External links
Official website 
National Museum of Ethnology on Google Arts & Culture

Museums established in 1965
Museums in Lisbon
National museums of Portugal
Ethnographic museums in Portugal
African art
Asian art